Vladimir Karpovich Pikalov (15 September 1924 – 29 March 2003) was a Soviet general.

During World War II, he was wounded several times and took part in the battles of Moscow, Stalingrad and Kursk.

He was in charge of the specialised military units at the site of the Chernobyl Nuclear Power Plant disaster. Pikalov arrived at the scene on the afternoon of 26 April 1986, and assumed command at Chernobyl.

Life 
Pikalov was born on 15 September 1924 in Armavir, now in Krasnodar Krai, into the family of a civil servant. From 1931 until May 1941 he studied in Kislovodsk secondary school number 7. Mariya Maksimovna Pikalova, his mother, died in 1973, and is buried in Moscow. His father, Karp Ivanovich Pikalov, died in 1974 and is buried in Armavir. 

At the Axis invasion of the Soviet Union, Pikalov was in 9th grade. He took part in the Second World War, seeing combat with the Western, Don, Stalingrad, the Steppe and the 2nd Belorussian fronts, participating in the liberation of Kursk, Minsk, Poznan, and as well as the storming of Berlin. He was wounded three times. He fought in artillery as a platoon commander, battery commander, assistant chief of staff of artillery division on reconnaissance, adjutant of a senior artillery division, reconnaissance officer of the regiment.

In August 1945 he entered the Voroshilov Higher Military Artillery School, from which he graduated in 1952 with a diploma of military engineer-chemist. He served as chief of the chemical service of the division, senior officer, deputy and chief of chemical troops of the military district, deputy chief of the military academy of education and research. A member of the All-Union Communist Party (Bolsheviks) since 1949.

From August 1966 to June 1968 he graduated from the Military Academy of the General Staff. From March 1968 to December 1988 he served as head of the Chemical Troops of the USSR Ministry of Defense. Pikalov arrived at the disaster site at the Chernobyl nuclear power plant a few hours after the April 1986 explosion at the head of the task force of the USSR Ministry of Defence, personally made a detour around the nuclear power plant with radiation measurements (having received exposure of 137 rems) and organized the arrival in the accident zone of the troops necessary for the most urgent work to eliminate the accident. He headed all the Ministry of Defence work to eliminate the disaster at the Chernobyl site until Army General Ivan Gerasymov, Commander-in-Chief of the Troops of the Southwestern Direction, relieved him. 

He died on 29 March 2003. He was buried with his family in the columbarium of the Donskoye Cemetery.

Recognition 
In December 1986, he was awarded the title of the Hero of the Soviet Union, for his role in the containment of the fallout from the Chernobyl catastrophe.

Cultural depictions 
Pikalov is portrayed by actor Mark Lewis Jones in Chernobyl.

See also 
Individual involvement in the Chernobyl disaster

References 

1924 births
2003 deaths
Chernobyl liquidators
Heroes of the Soviet Union
Recipients of the Order of Lenin
Recipients of the Order of the Red Banner of Labour
Recipients of the Order of the Red Star
Soviet colonel generals
NBC Protection Military Academy alumni
Military Academy of the General Staff of the Armed Forces of the Soviet Union alumni
Soviet military personnel of World War II
Recipients of the USSR State Prize